Chanel Cali (born 25 December 1983), better known by her stage name Shystie, is an English rapper, songwriter and actress. Her mother was born and raised in Barbados and her father was born and raised in Grenada, making her heritage West-Indian. She grew up in Hackney, East London. Shystie became famous in 2003 with her white label response to Dizzee Rascal's "I Luv U" and a tour with Basement Jaxx, The Streets and 50 Cent, which led to her being signed by major label Polydor. She is also the leading actress in the television series Dubplate Drama.

Debut album - Diamond in the Dirt
Shystie's debut studio album, Diamond in the Dirt was released in the UK only in 2004 by Polydor Records.

Her debut single was "One Wish", which peaked on its first week on the UK Singles Chart at number 40, having no mainstream radio or music channels' support besides Channel U and MTV Base. The B-side was "One Wish Remix", featuring Kano and produced by Terror Danja. Her second single was "Make It Easy" and the B-side was "Juiced"; it charted at number 57. Shystie's debut album went on to sell 60,000 copies across the UK, the same year she was nominated for 'Best Newcomer' at the MOBO Awards.

In 2004, Shystie featured in the computer game with her own character, Juiced, albeit only in the Acclaim beta version. She also recorded an accompanying song and video entitled "Juiced", which was featured on the game's beta soundtrack and her album as a bonus track. In the final version, Shystie is replaced by Sue Yen. This version of her song does not appear.

Dubplate Drama

Dubplate Drama is a British television series that aired on Channel 4 between 11 November 2005 and 3 July 2009. The show was created by Luke Hyamms, Shystie and her manager. The premise of the series involved a group of young musicians, with the leading role by Shystie, who was attempting to make it big by securing a record deal. Three series of the show were broadcast. The first series contained six fifteen-minute episodes, the second contained six thirty-minute episodes, and the third contained two feature-length specials of sixty minutes each. The show was described as "the world's first interactive drama series", as it allowed viewers to vote on the outcome of each episode. The first two series were released on DVD, with the third remaining unreleased. The show was notable for its well-known British talent, including roles played by Shystie, Noel Clarke, Adam Deacon, N-Dubz and Tim Westwood.

Kidulthood
In March 2006, Shystie had two songs, "One Wish" and "Woman’s World", featured in the film Kidulthood.

Adulthood
In June 2008, Shystie played the role of Lisa in the film Adulthood, the sequel to Kidulthood. She wrote the theme song "Arms Open Wide" which featured on the Adulthood soundtrack.

Sket
In September 2011, Shystie wrote the theme song for the feature film Sket along with writing four other songs which were used for the film.

Illegal Activity
In March 2012, Shystie played the role of Toya in the short film Illegal Activity, which premiered at the Bafta HQs.

Recent activity
In April and July 2011, Shystie released two mixtapes entitled You're Welcome and Blue Magic.

In September, Shystie modelled for English designer Nasir Mazhar at the London Fashion Week and was featured in Vogue for her performance.

In March 2012, Shystie released a promotional single and video for "Bad Gyal" and, in August, released her second promotional single and video for "Feel It", both from her EP Pink Mist, which was produced by LzBeatz.

In February 2013, Shystie modelled and performed at London Fashion Week again, and was featured in Vogue for the second time. The next month Shystie and Azealia Banks went from being friends to enemies after Banks posted on Twitter that Shystie and Azealia's "Control It" video was "bogus" and "not Azalea". Shystie released a diss track directed at Banks called "Doppelganger". The track replaced "Control It" as the third track on Pink Mist.

On 28 April 2013, Shystie released her EP independently through her in-house team Starwork Music, entitled Pink Mist via iTunes. It debuted at number 4 in the charts.

Between August and December that year, Shystie supported Kendrick Lamar on the European leg of his tour, and went on to perform in fifteen other countries. She was scheduled to model at New York Fashion Week and do more acting in 2014.

Filmography

Discography

Studio albums/EPs

Mixtapes

Singles

Promotional singles

Singles as featured artist

Soundtrack appearances

Music videos

Featured music videos

Awards and nominations

MOBO Awards 2004 - Best Newcomer - nominated
Broadcasting Press Guild Awards 2006 - Best Television Series [Dubplate Drama] - nominated
OMA Awards 2012 - Best Female for 2011 - nominated
OMA Awards 2012 - Best Video for a Mixtape for 2011 - nominated
OMA Awards 2012 - Best Grime Mixtape for 2011 - nominated

References

External links
 Official Youtube channel
 
 Interview With Underground Kulture

1983 births
English people of Barbadian descent
English people of Grenadian descent
English television actresses
English women rappers
Black British women rappers
Grime music artists
Rappers from London
British hip hop singers
English women in electronic music
Living people
Alumni of The College of Haringey, Enfield and North East London